Ansifera is a genus of midges in the family Cecidomyiidae. The five described species are found in the Palearctic and Oriental regions. The genus was first described by Mathias Jaschhof in 2009.

Species in this genus can be distinguished from others in the tribe Campylomyzini by characteristics of their antennal sensilla.

Species
Ansifera asetosa Jaschhof, 2009
Ansifera gombakensis Jaschhof, 2009
Ansifera japonica Jaschhof, 2009
Ansifera longipalpus Jaschhof, 2009
Ansifera malayensis Jaschhof, 2009

References

Cecidomyiidae genera

Insects described in 2009
Taxa named by Mathias Jaschhof